Dub Setter is a remix album by Jamaican reggae producer Lee "Scratch" Perry and British producer Adrian Sherwood, released January 2009 on Beat Records. The release comprises remixed tracks from Perry's 2008 album The Mighty Upsetter.

Track listing

Personnel 
Lee "Scratch" Perry – vocals
Adrian Sherwood – producer

Release history

References

External links 
 

2009 remix albums
Adrian Sherwood albums
Albums produced by Adrian Sherwood
On-U Sound Records albums
Lee "Scratch" Perry albums